Dans mon corps is the third studio album by Québécois Pop rock group Les Trois Accords released October 13, 2009.

Track listing
 "Dans mon corps" - 3:10
 "Ton pantalon est plein" - 3:02
 "Caméra vidéo" - 3:58
 "Elle s'appelait Serge" - 2:50
 "Nuit de la poésie" - 3:31
 "Le bureau du médecin" - 3:35
 "Pull pastel" - 4:31
 "Pas capable d'arrêter" - 2:52
 "La lune" - 4:03
 "Croquer des cous" - 6:00
 "Club optimiste" - 3:30

References 

2009 albums
Les Trois Accords albums
Indica Records albums
Albums produced by Gus van Go